Owen Renfroe is an American film and television director. He graduated from Wesleyan University, where he studied film with Professor Jeanine Basinger. His professional career began at age ten, when he sang in the children's chorus of the Metropolitan Opera Company.

Positions held
Hollywood Heights
 Director (2012)

General Hospital
 Director (2001–2012)

General Hospital: Night Shift
 Director (2007)

One Life to Live
 Associate Director/Director (1996–2001)

The Young and the Restless
 Director (November 30, 2012–present)

Awards and nominations
Daytime Emmy Award
Won, 2004–2006, Directing Team, General Hospital
Nominated, 2001, Multiple Camera Editing, One Life to Live

Directors Guild of America Award
Nominated, 2010, Outstanding Directorial Achievement in a Daytime Serial, "General Hospital"
Won, 2006, Outstanding Directorial Achievement in a Daytime Serial, General Hospital
Won, 1999 & 2001, Directing Team, One Life to Live

References

External links

2006 DGA Awards
Half Moon
UPI: Renfore

Wesleyan University alumni
American television directors
Living people
Year of birth missing (living people)
Directors Guild of America Award winners
Daytime Emmy Award winners